Mylinka is a rural locality (a village) in Karachevsky District, Bryansk Oblast, Russia. The population was 293 as of 2010. There are 18 streets.

Geography 
Mylinka is located 13 km northwest of Karachev (the district's administrative centre) by road. Voskresensky is the nearest rural locality.

References 

Rural localities in Karachevsky District